Nasiba Salayeva-Surkiyeva (also spelled Salaeva-Surkieva; born January 11, 1982) is a Turkmenistan judoka, who competed in the middleweight and half-heavyweight categories. Surkieva made her official debut for the 2000 Summer Olympics in Sydney, where she competed in the women's 78 kg class. She lost the first preliminary match to China's Tang Lin, who eventually won the gold medal in the finals. She offered another shot for the bronze medal through the repechage bouts, where she was defeated by Mongolia's Rambuugiin Dashdulam in the first round.

At the 2004 Summer Olympics in Athens, Surkieva switched to a lighter class by competing in the women's middleweight division, despite that she weighed 72 kilograms. She lost again in her first preliminary match by a more formidable opponent, two-time medalist and four-time Olympian Kate Howey of Great Britain, who scored an automatic ippon at three minutes and twenty-three seconds.

At the 2008 Summer Olympics in Beijing, Surkieva competed for the second time in the women's 70 kg class. She received a bye for the second preliminary match, before losing out to Ronda Rousey of the United States, who eventually won the bronze medal in this division.

In 2014 Asian Beach Games won silver medal.

References

External links
 
 NBC Olympics Profile
 2014 Asian Beach Games Profile
 

1982 births
Living people
Olympic judoka of Turkmenistan
Judoka at the 2000 Summer Olympics
Judoka at the 2004 Summer Olympics
Judoka at the 2008 Summer Olympics
Turkmenistan female judoka
Turkmenistan female sport wrestlers
Asian Games medalists in judo
Judoka at the 2002 Asian Games
Judoka at the 2006 Asian Games
Judoka at the 2010 Asian Games
Judoka at the 2014 Asian Games
Wrestlers at the 2006 Asian Games
Medalists at the 2002 Asian Games
Asian Games bronze medalists for Turkmenistan